Wang Kaihua (born 16 February 1994) is a Chinese male racewalking athlete. He has represented his country at the IAAF World Race Walking Team Championships in 2016, where he helped China to the team gold, and at the 2017 World Championships in Athletics, where he finished in seventh place.

Born in Lanzhou, he took part in racewalking competitions as a youth and participated at the 2011 World Youth Championships in Athletics. He is coached by Italian Sandro Damilano. Moving into the senior ranks, he began to establish himself at the Taicang Race Walking Challenge, placing second to Chen Ding. Wang was ranked the number one in the world over the 20 kilometres race walk distance in the 2017 season, having set a personal best of 1:17:54 hours to win at the Chinese National Grand Prix. This moved him into the top five all time fastest Chinese at the event.

International competitions

References

External links

Living people
1994 births
Chinese male racewalkers
World Athletics Championships athletes for China
Athletes (track and field) at the 2018 Asian Games
Asian Games medalists in athletics (track and field)
Asian Games gold medalists for China
Medalists at the 2018 Asian Games
Asian Games gold medalists in athletics (track and field)
Athletes (track and field) at the 2020 Summer Olympics
Olympic athletes of China